Like all municipalities of Puerto Rico, Arecibo is subdivided into administrative units called barrios, which are roughly comparable to minor civil divisions. The barrios and subbarrios, in turn, are further subdivided into smaller local populated place areas/units called sectores (sectors in English). The types of sectores may vary, from normally sector to urbanización to reparto to barriada to residencial, among others. Some sectors appear in two barrios.

List of sectors by barrio

Arecibo barrio-pueblo 

	Avenida 65 de Infantería 
	Avenida Constitución 
	Avenida Cotto 
	Avenida San Luis 
	Calle Los Héroes 
	Calles: Ledesma, Cruz Roja, Caribe, Avenida Miramar
	Comunidad Barrio Obrero 
	Comunidad La Múcura 
	Condominios del Atlántico 
	Reparto Cotto Viejo 
	Reparto San Juan 
	Residencial Bella Vista 
	Residencial Extensión Zeno Gandía 
	Residencial Ramón Marín 
	Residencial Trina Padilla 
	Urbanización Centro Urbano 
	Urbanización Radioville 
	Urbanización Zeno Gandía

Arenalejos 

	Calle Guzmán 
	Calle Oms 
	Colinas de Arenalejos
	Comunidad Bithorn 
	Comunidad Carriones 1 
	Comunidad Carriones 2 
	Comunidad Mena 
	Égida Miraflores 
	Jardines de Palo Blanco 
	Sector Abra Fría 
	Sector Cielo Tapao 
	Sector Cuatro Calles 
	Sector Cuesta Colorá 
	Sector El Centro 
	Sector La Poza 
	Sector Los Pobres 
	Sector Miradero 
	Sector Palache
	Sector Palo Blanco 
	Sector Pollera 
	Sector Rincón Prieto 
	Sector Tejada 
	Sector Yahueca 
	Urbanización Hacienda Monte Verde 
	Urbanización Mansiones Aztecas 
	Urbanización Villa Linda 
	Urbanización Villa Nicole

Arrozal 

	Sector Las Cántaras 
	Sector Los Muertos 
	Sector Los Puertos
	Sector Quebrada del Palo 
	Sector Varela
	Sector Zenón Rivera

Cambalache 

	Callejón Cancela 
	Comunidad Domingo Ruiz 
	Finca Las Claras 
	Sector Santa Bárbara 
	Urbanización Brisas del Valle

Carreras 

	Sector Carreras I
	Sector Carreras II
	Sector Cuesta Biáfara 
	Sector Jagual 
	Sector Jurutungo

Domingo Ruíz 

	Calle Los Olmos
	Calle Severo Ocasio 
	Comunidad Buena Vista 
	Comunidad Pueblo Nuevo 
	Comunidad Villa Kennedy 
	Sector Bajadero 
	Sector Cuesta Manatí 
	Sector El Maga
   Silverio Apartments

Dominguito 

	Calle Estremera 
	Camino Estemera 
	Comunidad Javier Hernández 
	Comunidad Mattey 
	Reparto Isidoro Colón 
	Reparto Ramírez 
	Sector Alto Cuba 
	Sector Boquerón 
	Sector Cuatro Calles 
	Sector Cuchí 1 y 2 
	Sector Green 
	Sector Guayabota 
	Sector Juego de Bola 
	Sector Juncos 
	Sector La Joya 
	Sector La PRRA 
	Sector López 
	Sector Los Colones 
	Sector Los Pitches 
	Sector Mata de Plátano 
	Sector Valle Colinas 
	Sector Vira La Guagua 
	Urbanización Campo Alegre I 
	Urbanización Campo Alegre II 
	Urbanización Campo Alegre 
	Urbanización Jardines de Green 
	Urbanización Remanso de Dominguito 
	Urbanización Siverio 
	Urbanización Villa Vélez

Esperanza 

	Comunidad Juan A. Díaz Crespo 
	Comunidad Richie Crespo 
	Sector Arenita 
	Sector Cienegueta 
	Sector Hess 
	Sector Hoyo Caña 
	Sector La Paloma 
	Sector Las Marías II 
	Sector Las Marías 
	Sector Patillo 
	Sector San Rafael
	Sector Sonadora
	Sector Sonadora Chiquita

Factor 

	Calle Los Méndez 
	Calle Los Rivera 
	Comunidad Ánimas 
	Comunidad Factor I 
	Hacienda El Paraíso 
	Reparto Pastrana 
	Sector 50 Cuerdas 
	Sector Ánimas Sur 
	Sector Ánimas 
	Sector Cercadillo 
	Sector El Palmar 
	Sector Factor I 
	Sector La PRRA 
	Sector Las Arenas 
	Sector Las Flores 
	Sector Polilla 
	Urbanización Campos
	Urbanización Estancias de Arecibo 
	Urbanización Jardines Factor 
	Urbanización Los Jardines 
	Urbanización Paseos de la Reina 
	Urbanización Paseos Reales 
	Urbanización Puerta del Este 
	Urbanización Vistamar Estate

Garrochales 

	Comunidad San Luis 
	Sector Bethania 
	Sector Bosque Cambalache 
	Sector El Alto 
	Sector El Salao 
	Sector Factor II 
	Sector La PRRA 
	Sector Noriega 
	Sector Sabana 
	Sector Salao 
	Sector San Luis 
	Urbanización Haciendas de Garrochales 
	Urbanización Jardines de Bethania 
	Urbanización Villas de Garrochales

Hato Abajo 

	Apartamentos Hermano Durán
	Apartamentos La Paz 
	Avenida San Daniel 
	Avenida San Luis 
	Calle Anita Vázquez 
	Callejon Los Ávila 
	Camino Los García 
	Comunidad Mora 
	Comunidad Navas 
	Comunidad Nuevas Hato Arriba 
	Comunidad Víctor Rojas 1 
	Comunidad Víctor Rojas 2 
	Condominios Terrazul 
	Égida Adolfo Martínez
	Jardines de Hato Arriba 
	Monte Brisas
	Paseo La Esmeralda 
	Paseo los Húcares 
	Reparto Colina Verde 
	Reparto Glorivee 
	Reparto Luribet 
	Reparto Pérez Abreu 
	Reparto San Jorge 
	Reparto San Miguel 
	Residencial La Meseta 
	Sector Barrancas 
	Sector Combate 
	Sector Cunetas 
	Sector Denton 
	Sector El Rosario 
	Sector El Tamarindo 
	Sector El Tanque
	Sector El Tres 
	Sector Iglesia 
	Sector Jayuya 
	Sector Juncos 
	Sector Korea
	Sector La Ceiba 
	Sector Las Canelas 
	Sector Los Delgado 
	Sector Los Mora 
	Sector Luis Delgado Hernández 
	Sector San Daniel 
	Sector Tamarindo 
	Urbanización Reparto Edna 
	Urbanización Alturas de San Daniel 
	Urbanización Alturas del Atlántico 
	Urbanización Alturas del Paraíso 
	Urbanización Campo Real 
	Urbanización Ciudad Atlantis 
	Urbanización Colinas de Palmarito 
	Urbanización Colinas de Villa Toledo 
	Urbanización El Paraíso 
	Urbanización Ermelinda Estate 
	Urbanización Estancias del Norte 
	Urbanización Estancias El Verde
	Urbanización Extensión Villa Los Santos II 
	Urbanización Hacienda de Juncos 
	Urbanización Hacienda del Mar
	Urbanización Hacienda Toledo
	Urbanización Jardines de Arecibo 
	Urbanización Jardines de Juncos 
	Urbanización Jardines de San Rafael 
	Urbanización Las Brisas 
	Urbanización Los Corozos 
	Urbanización Parque de Jardines 
	Urbanización Paseo del Prado  
	Urbanización Paseo Los Robles
	Urbanización Valle Escondido 
	Urbanización Villa Delgado 
	Urbanización Villa Gloria 
	Urbanización Villa Rubí 
	Urbanización Villa Toledo 
	Urbanización Villas de Altamira 
	Urbanización Vista Azul 
       Urbanización Vistas del Atlántico 
	Urbanización Vista Hermosa 
	Urbanización y Extensión Marisol 
	Villa Iris
	Villa Los Ángeles 
	Villa Rosa 
	Villas del Remanso

Hato Arriba 

	Sector Juncos 
	Urbanización El Monte 
	Urbanización Paseo Los Ángeles

Hato Viejo 

	Sector Arizona 
	Sector Calichoza 
	Sector Canta Gallo 
	Sector Derrame 
	Sector La Pica 
	Sector Llanada 
	Sector Los Sauces 
	Sector San Pedro

Islote 

	Callejón del Cristo (Callejón del Diablo) 
	Callejón Francés Apartamentos Oceanía 
	Comunidad Islote I y II 
	Comunidad Jarealito 
	Comunidad Vigía
	Condominios Atlántica 
	Sector Boán 
	Sector Caracoles
	Sector Cueva del Indio 
	Sector El Callejón 
   Sector La Vía
	Sector Melilla 
	Sector Pasaje 
   Sector Piquiña 
	Sector Rincón Chiquito 
	Sector Rincón Grande 
	Sector Vívora 
	Urbanización Brisas de Palma Roja 
	Urbanización Brisas del Mar I y II 
	Urbanización Corales del Mar 
	Urbanización Costa de Oro 
	Urbanización Costa del Atlántico 
	Urbanización Costas del Mar 
	Urbanización Reparto Maritza

Miraflores 

	Sector Biáfara 
	Sector Espino 
	Sector Las Arenas 
	Sector Villisla
	Urbanización Monte Escondido

Río Arriba 

	Sector Central Hidroeléctrica 
	Sector Cuerpo de Paz 
	Sector Dos Bocas 
	Sector El Valle 
	Sector Jobo 
	Sector La Canina I y II 
	Sector Los Chorros 
	Sector Vacupey

Sabana Hoyos 

	Calle Las Brisas 
	Comunidad Moreda 
	Comunidad Nuevas Sabana Hoyos 
	Hacienda San José
	Reparto Los Rosario 
	Sector Aldea 
	Sector Alianza
	Sector Allende 
	Sector Asomante 
	Sector Ballajá
	Sector Candelaria 
	Sector Carolina 
	Sector Comisión 
	Sector Córdova 
	Sector Fortuna 
	Sector Hacienda Las Abras 
	Sector Jovales 
	Sector La Alianza
	Sector La Vega 
	Sector Las Arenas 
	Sector Las Correa 
	Sector Loma Correa 
	Sector Manantiales 
	Sector Méndez 
	Sector Montaña 
	Sector Riachuelo 
	Sector Román 
	Sector Segunda Unidad
	Sector Villa Ferré 
	Sector Walcott 
	Urbanización Brisas de Manantiales 
	Urbanización Estancias de la Sabana
	Urbanización Estancias Palma Real 
	Urbanización Flamboyanes 
	Urbanización Hacienda San Agustín 
	Urbanización Jardines de Candelaria 
	Urbanización Manantiales 
	Urbanización Mansiones de Manantiales 
	Urbanización Reparto Manantiales 
	Urbanización Reparto Santa María 
	Urbanización Reparto Vista Verde 
	Urbanización Sabana Gardens
	Urbanización Sabana I
	Urbanización Villa Fortuna

Santana 

	Apartamentos Paseos Reales 
	Calle Gerónimo 
	Calle Landrón 
	Calle Los Rivera 
	Comunidad Las Pérez 
	Comunidad Los Llanos 
	Condominios Arecibo Apartments 
	Hermandad 
	Sector Ánimas 
	Sector Cercadillo 
	Sector El Palmar 
	Sector La Represa 
	Sector Los Gallegos 
	Sector Puerco Flaco 
	Urbanización El Capitolio 
	Urbanización Estancias Balseiro 
	Urbanización Estancias del Molino 
	Urbanización Los Pinos
	Urbanización Los Pinos 2
	Urbanización Paseos Reales 
	Urbanización Sagrado Corazón 
	Urbanización Tanamá 
	Urbanización Villa Mena

Tanamá 

	Comunidad Abra San Francisco 
	Condominios Villa Campestre 
	Sector Charco Hondo 
	Sector Colloral 
	Sector Curva de Bravo 
	Sector El Dique 
	Sector Higuillales 
	Sector Juan Saúl 
	Sector La Guinea
	Sector La Planta 
	Sector Los Caños
	Sector Los Chinos 
	Sector Marcos Soto 
	Sector Ojo del Agua 
	Sector Oriente
	Urbanización Camino del Valle 
	Urbanización Estancias de la Riviera 
	Urbanización Valle Verde 
	Urbanización Villa Ángela

See also

 List of communities in Puerto Rico

References

External links
 Desglose de Sectores on Oficina de Planificación

Arecibo
Arecibo